Lescot is a surname. Notable people with the surname include:

Jean-Baptiste Fleuriot-Lescot (1761–94), French architect, revolutionary
Hortense Haudebourt-Lescot (1784–1845), French painter
Andrée Lescot (active 1950–60s), Haitian singer, daughter of Élie Lescot
Élie Lescot (1883–1974), the President of Haiti from May 15, 1941, to January 11, 1946
Pierre Lescot (1510–1578), French architect active during the French Renaissance

See also
Lescot Wing, the oldest portion existing above ground level of the Louvre Palace, in Paris, France
Lescott